Polycarpaea nivea is a species of flowering plants in the family Caryophyllaceae. The species was described by William Aiton in 1828 as Achyranthes nivea, and it was placed in the genus Polycarpaea by Philip Barker Webb in 1849. The specific name nivea is Latin for "white as snow", and refers to the colour of the plant.

Description
It is a low plant with succulent, silvery, densely haired leaves.

Distribution
The species occurs in Mauritania, Morocco, the Canary Islands and Cape Verde.

Synonyms
Achyranthes nivea Aiton - basionym
Polycarpaea microphylla Cav. (1801)
Illecebrum gnaphalodes Schousb.
Polycarpaea gnaphalodes (Schousb.) Poir. (1816)
Polycarpaea candida Webb & Berthel. (1840)
Polycarpaea candida var. diffusa Pit. (1909)
Polycarpaea candida var. pygmaea Pit. (1909)
Polycarpaea candida var. robusta Pit. (1909)
Polycarpaea robusta (Pit.) G.Kunkel (1976)
Polycarpaea candida var. webbiana Pit. (1909)
Polycarpaea lancifolia Christ

References

Further reading

Jahandierz, E. & R. Maire (1932). Catalogue des Plantes du Maroc. [vol. 2] [Catalogue of Plants from Morocco: Vol. 2] Minerva, Lechevalier eds. Algiers, p. 213
Maire R. (1963) Flore de l'Afrique du Nord (Flora do North Africa)  Lechevalier ed., Paris, p. 77
Ozenda P. (1983) Flore du Sahara. (ed. 2) [Flora of the Sahara: 2nd Ed.]. Centre National de la Recherche Scientifique (CNRS.), Paris, p. 536
Greuter W., Burdet, H. M. & Long, G. (ed.) (1984). Med-Checklist [vol. 1] Conservatoire & Jardin botaniques de la Ville de Genève, p. 241
Hansen, A. & Sunding, P. (1993). Flora of Macaronesia. Checklist of vascular plants. 4. revised edition. Sommerfeltia 17: [1-295]
Fennane, M., Tattou, M. ibn, Mathez J. Ouyahya, A. & Oualidi, J. El (ed.)(1999). Flore pratique du Maroc. vol. [1] [Practical Flora of Morocco: Vol. [1]] Trav. Inst. Sci., Bot. Ser. 36. Rabat, p. 195
Fennane, M. & Tattou, M. ibn (2005). Flore vasculaire du Maroc. Inventaire et chorologie. [Vascular Flora of Morocco: Inventory and Chorology] Trav. Inst. Sci. Univ. Mohammed V, Bot. Ser. Bot. 37: [124]

External links

Images at Google (UK)

nivea
Flora of the Canary Islands
Flora of Cape Verde
Flora of Mauritania
Flora of Morocco
Taxa named by Philip Barker-Webb
Plants described in 1828